David Akin is a Canadian reporter, currently the chief political correspondent for Global News.

Akin's career began in 1993 with The Packet and Times in Orillia, Ontario, as the paper's city hall reporter. In 1995, he moved to The Chronicle Journal in Thunder Bay, where he worked as a senior reporter and joined The Hamilton Spectator and then the National Post, followed by The Globe and Mail.

From 2001 to 2008, Akin was a parliamentary correspondent for CTV News before joining Canwest News Service (now known as Postmedia) as a national affairs correspondent. At CTV, Akin won a Gemini Award for his reporting. The Globe and Mail reported that he resigned from Canwest on June 10, 2010, to become the first reporter for Sun Media's new all news cable service. From 2011 to 2015, he was the national bureau chief for Sun Media and the Sun News Network and hosted The Daily Brief and later, the hour-long show Battleground. He was briefly a freelance reporter after the demise of the channel before returning to the Sun chain, following its acquisition by Postmedia, as parliamentary bureau chief and sole member of the chain's Parliamentary bureau.

In February 2010, Akin reported, as fact, a rumor that Gordon Lightfoot had died. On September 13, 2022, Akin heckled newly-elected leader of the Official Opposition, Pierre Poilievre, with profanity, as he attempted to hold his first press conference.

References

Canadian newspaper journalists
Canadian male journalists
Living people
Canadian television news anchors
Canadian political journalists
20th-century Canadian journalists
21st-century Canadian journalists
Year of birth missing (living people)